Taylor Fritz defeated Maxime Cressy in the final, 6–2, 6–7(4–7), 7–6(7–4) to win the men's singles tennis title at the 2022 Eastbourne International.

Alex de Minaur was the defending champion, but lost in the semifinals to Fritz.

Seeds
The top four seeds receive a bye into the second round.

Draw

Finals

Top half

Bottom half

Qualifying

Seeds

Qualifiers

Draw

First qualifier

Second qualifier

Third qualifier

Fourth qualifier

References

External links
Main draw
Qualifying draw

Eastbourne International - Men's singles
2022 Men's singles